The Rose Lime Kiln, near Lake City, Colorado, was built in 1881.  It was listed on the National Register of Historic Places in 1993.

The lime kiln was built by local brickmason Samuel Tarkington for George S. Lee, a Capitol City, Colorado capitalist and mine developer.  It was named in honor of George's daughter Rose Lee and processed limestone mined from the Rose Lime Lode, an adjoining mining claim.

It has also been known as Henson Creek Chimney. The Kiln was destroyed by an avalanche in the spring of 2019.

References

Lime kilns in the United States		
National Register of Historic Places in Hinsdale County, Colorado